VDD may refer to:

 VDD, the label of an IC power supply pin
 A version description document according to MIL-STD-498
 Software development processes value-driven design
 Virtual device driver (disambiguation)
 Voluntary death by dehydration, a suicide method employing terminal dehydration
 Vendor Due Diligence
 VIDAS D-dimer